Zhao Shi may refer to:
Emperor Duanzong of Song, also known as Zhao Shi (趙昰)
Trọng Thủy, also known as Zhao Shi (赵始)
Zhao Shi (footballer), Chinese footballer
Zhao Shi (politician), a Central Committee member